Clifford analysis, using Clifford algebras named after William Kingdon Clifford, is the study of Dirac operators, and Dirac type operators in analysis and geometry, together with their applications.

Euclidean space 
In Euclidean space the Dirac operator has the form
 
where e1, ..., en is an orthonormal basis for Rn, and Rn is considered to be embedded in a complex Clifford algebra, Cln(C) so that .

This gives
 
where Δn is the Laplacian in n-euclidean space.

The fundamental solution to the euclidean Dirac operator is 

where ωn is the surface area of the unit sphere Sn−1.

Note that 
 
where 
 

The most basic example of a Dirac operator is the Cauchy–Riemann operator 
 
in the complex plane. Indeed, many basic properties of one variable complex analysis follow through for many first order Dirac type operators. In euclidean space this includes a Cauchy Theorem, a Cauchy integral formula, Morera's theorem, Taylor series, Laurent series and Liouville Theorem. In this case the Cauchy kernel is G(x−y). The proof of the Cauchy integral formula is the same as in one complex variable and makes use of the fact that each non-zero vector x in euclidean space has a multiplicative inverse in the Clifford algebra, namely 
 
Up to a sign this inverse is the Kelvin inverse of x. Solutions to the euclidean Dirac equation Df = 0 are called (left) monogenic functions. Monogenic functions are special cases of harmonic spinors on a spin manifold.

In 3 and 4 dimensions Clifford analysis is sometimes referred to as quaternionic analysis. When , the Dirac operator is sometimes referred to as the Cauchy–Riemann–Fueter operator. Further some aspects of Clifford analysis are referred to as hypercomplex analysis.

Clifford analysis has analogues of Cauchy transforms, Bergman kernels, Szegő kernels, Plemelj operators, Hardy spaces, a Kerzman–Stein formula and a Π, or Beurling–Ahlfors, transform. These have all found applications in solving boundary value problems, including moving boundary value problems, singular integrals and classic harmonic analysis. In particular Clifford analysis has been used to solve, in certain Sobolev spaces, the full water wave problem in 3D. This method works in all dimensions greater than 2.

Much of Clifford analysis works if we replace the complex Clifford algebra by a real Clifford algebra, Cln. This is not the case though when we need to deal with the interaction between the Dirac operator and the Fourier transform.

The Fourier transform
When we consider upper half space Rn,+ with boundary Rn−1, the span of e1, ..., en−1, under the Fourier transform the symbol of the Dirac operator

is iζ where

In this setting the Plemelj formulas are 
 
and the symbols for these operators are, up to a sign, 

These are projection operators, otherwise known as mutually annihilating idempotents, on the space of Cln(C) valued square integrable functions on Rn−1.

Note that

where Rj is the j-th Riesz potential,

it is easily determined from the Clifford multiplication that

So the convolution operator  is a natural generalization to euclidean space of the Hilbert transform.

Suppose U′ is a domain in Rn−1 and g(x) is a Cln(C) valued real analytic function. Then g has a Cauchy–Kovalevskaia extension to the Dirac equation on some neighborhood of U′ in Rn. The extension is explicitly given by

When this extension is applied to the variable x in

we get that

is the restriction to Rn−1 of E+ + E− where E+ is a monogenic function in upper half space and E− is a monogenic function in lower half space.

There is also a Paley–Wiener theorem in n-Euclidean space arising in Clifford analysis.

Conformal structure
Many Dirac type operators have a covariance under conformal change in metric. This is true for the Dirac operator in euclidean space, and the Dirac operator on the sphere under Möbius transformations. Consequently, this holds true for Dirac operators on conformally flat manifolds and conformal manifolds which are simultaneously spin manifolds.

Cayley transform (stereographic projection) 
The Cayley transform or stereographic projection from Rn to the unit sphere Sn transforms the euclidean Dirac operator to a spherical Dirac operator DS. Explicitly

where Γn is the spherical Beltrami–Dirac operator

and x in Sn.

The Cayley transform over n-space is

Its inverse is

For a function f(x) defined on a domain U in n-euclidean space and a solution to the Dirac equation, then

is annihilated by DS, on C(U) where

Further

the conformal Laplacian or Yamabe operator on Sn. Explicitly

where  is the Laplace–Beltrami operator on Sn. The operator  is, via the Cayley transform, conformally equivalent to the euclidean Laplacian. Also

is the Paneitz operator,

on the n-sphere. Via the Cayley transform this operator is conformally equivalent to the bi-Laplacian, . These are all examples of operators of Dirac type.

Möbius transform 
A Möbius transform over n-euclidean space can be expressed as 
 
where a, b, c and d ∈ Cln and satisfy certain constraints. The associated  matrix is called an Ahlfors–Vahlen matrix. If 
 
and Df(y) = 0 then  is a solution to the Dirac equation where 
 
and ~ is a basic antiautomorphism acting on the Clifford algebra. The operators Dk, or Δnk/2 when k is even, exhibit similar covariances under Möbius transform including the Cayley transform.

When ax+b and cx+d are non-zero they are both members of the Clifford group.

As 
 
then we have a choice in sign in defining J(M, x). This means that for a conformally flat manifold M we need a spin structure on M in order to define a spinor bundle on whose sections we can allow a Dirac operator to act. Explicit simple examples include the n-cylinder, the Hopf manifold obtained from n-euclidean space minus the origin, and generalizations of k-handled toruses obtained from upper half space by factoring it out by actions of generalized modular groups acting on upper half space totally discontinuously. A Dirac operator can be introduced in these contexts. These Dirac operators are special examples of Atiyah–Singer–Dirac operators.

Atiyah–Singer–Dirac operator
Given a spin manifold M with a spinor bundle S and a smooth section s(x) in S then, in terms of a local orthonormal basis e1(x), ...,  en(x) of the tangent bundle of M, the Atiyah–Singer–Dirac operator acting on s is defined to be 
 
where  is the spin connection, the lifting to S of the Levi-Civita connection on M. When M is n-euclidean space we return to the euclidean Dirac operator.

From an Atiyah–Singer–Dirac operator D we have the Lichnerowicz formula 
 
where τ is the scalar curvature on the manifold, and Γ∗ is the adjoint of Γ. The operator D2 is known as the spinorial Laplacian.

This is Lichnerowicz' theorem. It is readily seen that Lichnerowicz' theorem is a generalization of Liouville's theorem from one variable complex analysis. This allows us to note that over the space of smooth spinor sections the operator D is invertible such a manifold.

In the cases where the Atiyah–Singer–Dirac operator is invertible on the space of smooth spinor sections with compact support one may introduce
 
where δy is the Dirac delta function evaluated at y. This gives rise to a Cauchy kernel, which is the  fundamental solution to this Dirac operator. From this one may obtain a Cauchy integral formula for harmonic spinors. With this kernel much of what is described in the first section of this entry carries through for invertible Atiyah–Singer–Dirac operators.

Using Stokes' theorem, or otherwise, one can further determine that under a conformal change of metric the Dirac operators associated to each metric are proportional to each other, and consequently so are their inverses, if they exist.

All of this provides potential links to Atiyah–Singer index theory and other aspects of geometric analysis involving Dirac type operators.

Hyperbolic Dirac type operators
In Clifford analysis one also considers differential operators on upper half space, the disc, or hyperbola with respect to the hyperbolic, or Poincaré metric.

For upper half space one splits the Clifford algebra, Cln into Cln−1 + Cln−1en. So for a in Cln one may express a as b + cen with a, b in Cln−1. One then has projection operators P and Q defined as follows P(a) = b and Q(a) = c. The Hodge–Dirac operator acting on a function f with respect to the hyperbolic metric in upper half space is now defined to be 
. 
In this case 
. 
The operator 
 
is the Laplacian with respect to the Poincaré metric while the other operator is an example of a Weinstein operator.

The hyperbolic Laplacian is invariant under actions of the conformal group, while the hyperbolic Dirac operator is covariant under such actions.

Rarita–Schwinger/Stein–Weiss operators
Rarita–Schwinger operators, also known as Stein–Weiss operators, arise in representation theory for the Spin and Pin groups. The operator Rk is a conformally covariant first order differential operator. Here k = 0, 1, 2, .... When k = 0, the Rarita–Schwinger operator is just the Dirac operator. In representation theory for the orthogonal group, O(n) it is common to consider functions taking values in spaces of homogeneous harmonic polynomials. When one refines this representation theory to the double covering Pin(n) of O(n) one replaces spaces of homogeneous harmonic polynomials by spaces of k homogeneous polynomial solutions to the Dirac equation, otherwise known as k monogenic polynomials. One considers a function f(x, u) where x in U, a domain in Rn, and u varies over Rn. Further f(x, u) is a k-monogenic polynomial in u. Now apply the Dirac operator Dx in x to f(x, u). Now as the Clifford algebra is not commutative Dxf(x, u) then this function is no longer k monogenic but is a homogeneous harmonic polynomial in u. Now for each harmonic polynomial hk homogeneous of degree k there is an Almansi–Fischer decomposition 
 
where pk and pk−1 are respectively k and k−1 monogenic polynomials. Let P be the projection of hk to pk then the Rarita–Schwinger operator is defined to be PDk, and it is denoted by Rk. Using Euler's Lemma one may determine that 

So

Conferences and Journals
There is a vibrant and interdisciplinary community around Clifford and Geometric Algebras with a wide range of applications. The main conferences in this subject include the International Conference on Clifford Algebras and their Applications in Mathematical Physics (ICCA) and Applications of Geometric Algebra in Computer Science and Engineering (AGACSE) series. A main publication outlet is the Springer journal Advances in Applied Clifford Algebras.

See also
Clifford algebra
Complex spin structure
Conformal manifold
Conformally flat manifold
Dirac operator
Poincaré metric
Spin group
Spin structure
Spinor bundle

References

.
.  
.
.
.
. 
.
.
.
.
.
.
.
.
.
.
.
.

External links
Lecture notes on Dirac operators in analysis and geometry

Differential geometry